Fuentes is a genus of jumping spiders that was first described by George and Elizabeth Peckham in 1894.  it contains only two species, found only in Central America and Mexico: F. pertinax and F. yucatan.

References

External links
 Salticidae.org: Diagnostic drawings

Salticidae genera
Salticidae
Spiders of Central America
Spiders of Mexico